The Abbey Theatre is situated on Pool Bank Street in the Abbey Ward of Nuneaton, England, and is managed and run by volunteers by the Nuneaton Arts Council (NAC).

The venue hosts performances including visiting theatre companies, touring shows, musicals, pantomime and drama, dance, comedy and film screenings.

The theatre's manager is Tony Deeming. It is run as a charity by Nuneaton Arts Council. The theatre's charity number is 259613.

With a regular annual attendance of over 30,000, the Abbey is the only public theatre in Nuneaton and one of the busiest venues in Warwickshire.

History
The Nuneaton Arts Council was founded in 1969 by a group of local arts devotees who noted the continuing demise of other venues in Nuneaton. When the local Territorial Army drill hall became available, the new Arts Council began converting the building. The task was completed in 1974, and the first performance was from the Nuneaton Pantomime and Revue Society, with their production of Finian's Rainbow.

For several years in the 1980s the theatre was the town's only cinema following the closure of the last full time picture house, The Ritz. It continued semi-regular screenings until the new Odeon multi-screen complex opened in the nearby Bermuda Estate.

In 2003, the building closed with no notice after asbestos was identified in many parts of the venue, some of which had been disturbed during recent modification works to upgrade the facilities. The doors were closed for 6 months, but after agreement with the local authority (the building's landlord) a rescue package was agreed and the theatre re-opened in the early autumn.

On 22 January 2007, a performance of the Pied Piper of Hamelin went up half an hour late after contractors had inadvertently concreted emergency doors shut. In 2008, The Masqueraders Theatrical society moved from the Bedworth Civic Hall to the Abbey Theatre, due to the costs of hiring the much larger Bedworth venue.

November 2008 saw an entire winter season at the Abbey nearly come to a halt because of the demolition of the old Co-op Hall, situated immediately behind the theatre, which was to become a Lidl supermarket. Last-minute talks narrowly avoided all shows in that month being cancelled. In August 2012, the theatre got permission to install air conditioning in all public areas of the building.

In June 2014, the theatre took part in the UK Heritage Open Weekend and the public were invited to take a look around the theatre.

In March 2015, the theatre was the venue for what was thought to be the largest ghost hunters convention in the UK. 

During March 2015 the venue was also used for a Beats project which was featured on BBC Radio One.

One of the biggest challenges to the Abbey, and to all UK theatres, was in 2020 when the coronavirus (COVID-19) pandemic prompted all UK venues to close on March 16. On July 5 the UK government announced a £1.57 billion rescue package of grants and loans for the arts industry.

Facilities

The main house
The main house seats 250 people, with space for four wheelchair users with a carer seat by the side of each. The stage is a little over 3 feet high from floor level. Seating is raked (stepped) to the back of the auditorium.

Bar
The bar has hosted smaller events such as comedy nights, small acoustic sessions, and meetings. In the bar area are chairs, sofas and various screens for showing advertising for forthcoming events.

Milby room
The Milby room can accommodate up to 60 people. It is used as a rehearsal space for various groups, for local chess club meetings every Monday evening, and by the local neighborhood watch team for local resident meetings.

Etone Lounge
This is the biggest space outside of the main house and can be used to put on small productions, as this space can seat up to 100 people depending on the layout. This space is mainly used for rehearsals for the local groups as well as for meetings.

The future
In February 2014 it was announced that the NAC was working in conjunction with Nuneaton and Bedworth Borough Council (NBBC) to design and build a new community arts complex within the town's ring road. Although this project has yet to be fully realised, in 2019 the NAC became associated with the Transforming Nuneaton Project (TNP).

References

External links
 Abbey Theatre homepage.
 Ents24.
 List.
 Whats on Stage.

Theatres in Warwickshire
Buildings and structures in Nuneaton